The 1945 Campeonato Paulista da Primeira Divisão, organized by the Federação Paulista de Futebol, was the 44th season of São Paulo's top professional football league. São Paulo won the title for the 3rd time. no teams were relegated and the top scorers were Corinthians's Servílio and São Paulo Railway's Passarinho with 17 goals.

Championship
The championship was disputed in a double-round robin system, with the team with the most points winning the title.

Top Scores

References

Campeonato Paulista seasons
Paulista